Kenneth Leigh Goodman (born September 17, 1947) is an American politician and a former Democratic member of the North Carolina General Assembly. He represented the 66th district. Goodman resigned from the legislature in 2019 to accept an appointment from Gov. Roy Cooper to serve on the North Carolina Industrial Commission.

During the 2016 legislative session, Goodman was one of 11 Democrats to vote in favor of HB2, the controversial "Bathroom Bill."

Goodman graduated from Wingate University for his associate degree, and from Florida State University for his bachelor's degree. Goodman is the son of Richmond County Sheriff R. W. Goodman.

Electoral history

2018

2016

2014

2012

2010

References

Living people
21st-century American politicians
1947 births
Democratic Party members of the North Carolina House of Representatives